The People's Liberation Army Navy (PLAN) is the naval branch of the People's Liberation Army (PLA). The PLAN force consists of about 250,000 men and over a hundred major combat vessels, organized into three fleets: the North Sea Fleet, the East Sea Fleet, and the South Sea Fleet. Below is the organizational structure of the PLAN.

PLAN headquarters

PLAN headquarters is subordinate to the PLA General Staff Department and the Chairman of the Central Military Committee .

Information current as of March 2007
 Commander-in-Chief of the Navy: Admiral Wu Shengli

 Political Commissar of the Navy: Admiral Miao Hua

Deputy Commanders: 
 Ding Yiping
 Jin Mao
 Shen Binyi
 Wang Yucheng
 Zhang Yongyi
 Zhang Zhannan
 Zhao Xingfa
 Gu Wengen

Deputy Political Commissars:
 Kang Chengyuan
 Fan Yinhua
 Wu Huayang

Chief of Naval Staff: Ding Yiping
Director of Political Department: Xu Jianzhong

Fleet Commanders

 North Sea Fleet: Rear Admiral Tian Zhong; Political Commissar Li Guang
 East Sea Fleet: Vice Admiral Xu Hongmen; Political Commissar Xu Jianzhong
 South Sea Fleet: Vice Admiral Gu Wengen; Political Commissar Huang Jiaxiang

Fleets
The People's Liberation Army Navy is divided into three fleets.

{| class="wikitable sortable" 
|+China PLA Navy Sea Fleets (2007)
! Fleet
! Status
! Parent Command
! Patrol Region
! Headquarters
! Flagship
|- valign="top"
| North Sea Fleet (NSF)
| Active
| Northern Theater Command
| Bohai Bay, Yellow Sea
| Qingdao, Shandong Province
| DDG 112 Harbin, Type 052 Luhu-class Destroyer
|- valign="top"
| East Sea Fleet (ESF)
| Active
| Eastern Theater Command
| East China Sea
| Ningbo, Zhejiang Province
| DDG 150 Changchun, Type 052C Luyang II-class Destroyer
|- valign="top"
| South Sea Fleet (SSF)
| Active
| Southern Theater Command
| South China Sea
| Zhanjiang, Guangdong Province
| AOR/AK Nanchang
|}

Bases
North Sea Fleet
Major bases: Qingdao (HQ), Huludao, Jianggezhuang, Guzhen Bay, Lushun, Xiaopingdao. Minor bases: Weihai Wei, Qingshan, Luda, Lianyungang, Ling Shan, Ta Ku Shan, Changshandao, Liuzhuang, Dayuanjiadun, Dalian

East Sea Fleet
Major bases: Ningbo (HQ), Zhoushan, Shanghai, Daxie, Fujian. Minor bases: Zhenjiangguan, Wusong, Xinxiang, Wenzhou, Sanduao, Xiamen, Xingxiang, Quandou, Wen Zhou SE, Wuhan, Dinghai, Jiaotou

South Sea Fleet
Major bases: Zhanjiang (HQ), Yulin, Huangfu, Hong Kong, Guangzhou (Canton). Minor bases: Haikou, Shantou, Humen, Kuanchuang, Tsun, Kuan Chung, Mawei, Beihai, Ping Tan, San Chou Shih, Tang-Chiah Huan, Longmen, Bailong, Dongcun, Baimajing, Xiachuandao, Yuchi

Branches 
The PLAN is organised into five branches:
 People's Liberation Army Navy Surface Force
 People's Liberation Army Navy Submarine Force
 People's Liberation Army Navy Coastal Defense Force
 People's Liberation Army Naval Air Force
 People's Liberation Army Marine Corps

References

External links 
 Sinodefence.com
 Global Security PLAN Overview
 GIGA German Institute of Global and Area Studies China Data Supplement
 Office of Naval Intelligence China's Navy 2007
 CRS Report for Congress: China Naval Modernization: Implications for U.S Navy Capabilities — Background and Issues for Congress

Structure of contemporary navies